Tetrakis(pyridine)silver(II) peroxydisulfate is a chemical compound which contains silver in the rare oxidation state of +2.

Preparation
The salt can be easily prepared by oxidizing a soluble silver salt with excess potassium peroxydisulfate in aqueous pyridine solution, where upon the product precipitates out almost quantitatively.

 2 AgNO3 + 8 C5H5N + 3 K2S2O8 → 2 [Ag(C5H5N)4]S2O8 + 2 K2SO4 + 2 KNO3

Structure

Since the Ag2+ ion has a d9 configuration, the salt is paramagnetic.

Properties

The compound is in the form of non-hygroscopic orange granulate. It is stable in the air for several days when stored away from light, and is stable up to several months if dried in vacuo over potassium hydroxide, decomposing into a white paste. Its stability can be attributed to its insolubility in both polar and non-polar solvents.

The compound decomposes at 137 °C. It dissolves in concentrated nitric acid without reduction, and is converted to the black silver(II) oxide in aqueous sodium hydroxide solution.

It is a powerful oxidizing agent, and is illustrated by the fact that it oxidizes Mn2+ ions to permanganates. When the pyridine ligands were removed, the transient square planar [Ag(H2O)4]2+ remains, which spontaneously oxidizes water to oxygen.

 Ag2+ + e−  Ag+ {E° = +1.980 V}

Applications in organic chemistry

The complex ion can easily oxidize alcohol, aldehyde and amine, and capable of decarboxylating α-hydroxycarboxylic acids and phenylacetic acids to give the corresponding carbonyl compounds. Benzylic C-H bonds are oxidatively converted to carbonyl groups:

Aromatic thiols and allylaryl thioethers are oxidized to arylsulfonic acids, which gives an alternative route to produce arylsulfonic acids with mild conditions.

Safety

As the compound contains the peroxydisulfate ion as the counter anion, this compound should be treated as an explosive even though its explosive properties were not well established. The complex also releases tiny amounts of pyridine vapor which is a possible carcinogen.

References

Silver compounds
Pyridine complexes
Persulfates
Reagents for organic chemistry